Major Crimes is an American police procedural starring Mary McDonnell as Captain (later Commander) Sharon Raydor originally airing on the TNT network.  A spin-off of The Closer, Major Crimes follows the activities of the LAPD Major Crimes squad, charged with solving high-profile crimes in the city of Los Angeles, along with the members of the squad.  The show features an ensemble cast including McDonnell, G. W. Bailey as Lt. Provenza, Tony Denison as Lt. Flynn, Michael Paul Chan as Lt. Tao, Raymond Cruz as Det. Sanchez, Jon Tenney as FBI Liaison  Special Agent (later Deputy Chief) Fritz Howard, and Kearran Giovanni as Det. Sykes, as well as Graham Patrick Martin as Rusty Beck.  Major Crimes, created by James Duff and produced by Greer Sheppard and Michael M. Robin, was the highest rated scripted cable drama of 2012.

Series overview

Episodes

Season 1 (2012)
The theme for the first season is fairness.

Season 2 (2013–14)
Jonathan Del Arco (Deputy Medical Examiner Dr. Morales) and Robert Gossett (Assistant Chief Russell Taylor), previously recurring cast members, are now series regulars. Nadine Velazquez joins the cast as DDA Emma Rios, the prosecutor in charge of the Phillip Stroh case. Originally scheduled for 15 episodes, the season order was increased to 19. According to creator James Duff, the theme for season two is identity.

Season 3 (2014–15)
Jon Tenney is upgraded from recurring to regular status as Special Agent (soon-to-be LAPD Deputy Chief) Fritz Howard, but is only credited in the episodes in which he appears. Recurring guest stars include Tom Berenger as Sharon's husband Jack, Bill Brochtrup as Rusty's therapist Dr. Joe Bowman, Malcolm-Jamal Warner as SIS Lt. Chuck Cooper, Ransford Doherty as Coroner Investigator Kendall, Kathe Mazur as Deputy DA Andrea Hobbs and Laurie Holden as Special Operations Bureau (SOB) Commander Ann McGinnis. The theme for the season is expectations.

Season 4 (2015–16)
The theme for the season is courage.

Season 5 (2016–17)
Robert Gossett departs the series in the eleventh episode of the season, in which Asst. Chief Taylor dies in a courtroom shootout. The theme for the season is balance. The final eight episodes focus on connections.

Season 6 (2017–18)
Daniel Di Tomasso (Detective Wes Nolan) and Leonard Roberts (Assistant Chief Leo Mason) previously recurring cast members, are now series regulars. Jessica Meraz also joins the cast as Detective Camilla Paige, a new transfer who has a past with Provenza. Series star Mary McDonnell departs the series in the tenth episode, following Sharon Raydor's death from a heart attack. The themes for this season are faith, reason and risk.

Ratings

Season 1

Season 2

Season 3

Season 4

Season 5

See also 
 List of The Closer episodes

References

External links
 Major Crimes episode guide at TNT.com
 

Lists of American crime drama television series episodes